Jacek Beutler (born 20 July 1964) is a Polish judoka. He competed in the men's half-heavyweight event at the 1988 Summer Olympics.

References

External links
 

1964 births
Living people
Polish male judoka
Olympic judoka of Poland
Judoka at the 1988 Summer Olympics
People from Piła
Sportspeople from Greater Poland Voivodeship